Teresa "Tess" Lambe OBE is an Irish scientist working at Oxford University's Jenner Institute. She is one of the co-developers of the Oxford–AstraZeneca COVID-19 vaccine against the new coronavirus causing COVID-19.

Early life and education
Teresa Lambe is from Nicholastown, in Kilcullen, County Kildare, where she attended Cross and Passion College. Lambe studied pharmacology and molecular genetics at University College Dublin, where she completed her PhD in 2002 with Prof Finian Martin.

Career
Lambe is a scientist working at Oxford University's Jenner Institute. She is one of the co-developers of the Oxford vaccine against the new coronavirus causing COVID-19.

Previously, she worked on vaccines for Crimean Congo hemorrhagic fever, ebola, Lassa fever, MERS, and Nipah virus.

In 2021, she was awarded the UCD Alumni Award in Science 2021.

In 2021, she was appointed an Honorary Officer of the Order of the British Empire (OBE), for services to Science and Public Health.

In 2022, she was announced as one of the recipients of the  Presidential Distinguished Service Award for the Irish Abroad for 2022 in the category of Science, Technology & Innovation.

References

External links 

Year of birth missing (living people)
Living people
Alumni of University College Dublin
Academics of the University of Oxford
Irish women scientists
People from Kildare (town)
Irish expatriates in the United Kingdom
Honorary Officers of the Order of the British Empire